Būrk (Mongolian:Bürkh Malghai/Бүрх малгай) was a black lambskin cap associated with the Mughal period, mentioned in Baburnama.

See also 
Mughal emperors

References 

Headgear
Mughal clothing